Cape Labuan is a rocky point midway between Cape Arkona and Lavett Bluff, forming the southwest extremity of Heard Island. It was charted in 1948 by the Australian National Antarctic Research Expeditions and named after  , a relief ship for the expedition.

References
 

Headlands of Heard Island and McDonald Islands